Jeanne Lucienne Tomasini ( Maestracci, 25 June 1920 – 19 April 2022) was a French writer of historical novels.

Life and career
Jeanne Tomasini started to write at the age of 80 as a leisure activity. Most of her novels are inspired by her Corsican origins and full of vivid fictional portrayals of her characters and settings.

Tomasini died in La Garde, Var on 19 April 2022, at the age of 101.

Bibliography
 Les Obstinés (French Edition), Paris, Little Big Man, 2004
 Don Paolo (French Edition), Paris, Little Big Man, 2005
 Le Persan (French Edition), Paris, Little Big Man, 2006
 Ascanio Mio (French Edition), Paris, Little Big Man, 2008 
 Retour à Polveroso (French Edition), Paris, Little Big Man, 2007
 Opération rouge Baiser (French Edition), Paris, GdP, 2009
 A Monticello (French Edition), Paris, GdP, 2010
 Les enfants de l'abîme (French Edition), Paris, GdP, 2010
 Engrenage fatal (French Edition, Paris, GdP
 L´agent....0069 á l´lle du Levant (French Edition), 2012

References

External links
  Books of Jeanne Tomasini on Amazon.com
 Books of Jeanne Tomasini on Goodsreads.com
 Jeanne Tomasini - Portrayal
 Books of Jeanne Tomasini on Fnac.fr

1920 births
2022 deaths
21st-century French novelists
French centenarians
Women centenarians
People from Haute-Corse